Frangieh (: "Franc", meaning "occidental" in Arabic), also spelled Frangié, Franjieh, or Franjiyeh, is a prominent Lebanese political family.

Bassam Frangieh (born 1949), scholar of contemporary Arabic literature and culture. Distant relative of the politicians
Hamid Beik Frangieh (1907–1981), politician, older brother of Suleiman
Lamitta Frangieh (born 1980), 1st Runner-up at Miss Lebanon 2004 Competition
Samir Frangieh (1945–2017), politician and journalist
Suleiman Frangieh (1910–1992), President 1970 to 1976
Suleiman Frangieh, Jr. (born 1965), son of Tony, current leader of the Marada Movement
Tony Frangieh (1941–1978), son of Suleyman sr, militia leader during the Lebanese Civil War

See also
 List of political families in Lebanon

 
Roman Catholic families
Political families of Lebanon